York Vision (previously known as yorkVision and York Student Vision) is one of two student newspapers at the University of York. Vision is a registered society of, and is funded by the University of York Students' Union (YUSU).

Organisation
Unlike many other university newspapers, which have sabbatical editors, York Visions staff is made up entirely of current students. The current Editors are Katie Preston and Marti Stelling 

The newspaper itself contains several sections, with Opinion, Features, Lifestyle, Science, SCENE, and Climate  bookended by news and sport.

Special features
Vision has a number of features that help mould its distinct character. These include:
Interviews: Almost every section of the paper has, at one time or another, secured a top-tier interview. Recent highlights include Alastair Campbell, Miley Cyrus, Karl Pilkington, Hot Chip, Guantanamo detainee Moazzam Begg, Nick Clegg, Mark Watson, Franz Ferdinand, Shami Chakrabarti, Aaron Porter, Wretch 32, Dr Jessen, Harry Enfield and Sarah Beeny. In 2022, Marti Stelling interviewed Tik-Tok famous Katylee Bailey. 
SCENE: The arts pullout containing sections dedicated to Screen, Stage, Music, Books, Games, Relationships, Food, and Travel.
The Roses Specials: Either an annual pull-out published after the Roses Tournament, or a limited-run, special edition distributed during the tournament itself. The 2008 Roses review was incorporated into the Sport section. 2012 saw the largest scale Roses coverage yet, both online and in print, including a 16-page pull-out produced away from home at Lancaster University.
Goalside: A pull-out dedicated to coverage of the summer term 'College Cup', which dominates summer sport at the University of York, first published in 2012.
FRESH: The freshers magazine given to all new students at the University of York.

Notable former contributors
Mark Watts
Ste Curran
Dan Roberts - Guardian Brexit editor
Greg Jenner - Horrible Histories comedian 
Rajini Vaidyanathan - BBC News North America correspondent
Rob Harris - Associated Press reporter
Poppy Sharp - Food Correspondent

Controversies 
In early 2018, The Lemon Press, the University of York's satirical student magazine, accused York Vision of erroneously claiming to be the "most awarded student newspaper" in the country. The outcome of their investigation suggested that the United Kingdom's most awarded student newspaper was The Gryphon, of the University of Leeds. In response, York Vision changed their Twitter description to "one of the most awarded student publications".

The October 2018 issue of York Vision was removed from circulation for a back page advert that consisted of a link to an online submission form, and the heading "Send Nudes". The page received condemnation from the University of York Students' Union, which also claimed that issue had been published without their required approval. The paper was then sanctioned by YUSU and the society was suspended from operating until the start of the 2019/20 academic year under new leadership.

Awards
York Vision has received awards for its writing, design, and in both overall best publication and best small budget categories (due to the lack of sabbatical positions of the paper). In 2009 it was the only student newspaper without a full-time paid member of staff to be nominated for Guardian Student Newspaper of the Year.

It won the award four times in six years, having held the award from 2002–2004. Vision remains the only paper to achieve the remarkable hat-trick in the ceremony's 26-year history.

In 2011, Vision was named Student Publication of the Year at the Guardian Student Media Awards.

Guardian Student Media Awards

2015
 Best Opinion Writer: Edward Greenwood (Nominee)

2014 
 Best Publication (Winner)
 Best Reporter: Patrick Greenfield (Winner)

2013
 Best Publication (Runner up)
 Best Website (Nominee)

2012
 Best Reporter: Oliver Todd (Nominee)

2011 
 Best Publication (Winner)

2010
 Best Publication (Nominee)
 Best Reporter: Daniel Goddard (Nominee)
 Best Reporter: Martin Williams (Nominee)
 Best Writer: Jim Norton (Nominee)

2009
 Best Newspaper (Nominee)
 Best Reporter: Martin Williams (Nominee)
 Best Reporter: Tom McDermott (Nominee)
 Best Sports Writer: Jim Norton (Nominee)

2008
Best Reporter: Adam Thorn (Runner up)
Best Feature Writer: Anna Wormleighton (Nominee)
Best Sports Writer: Grumpy Panda Alex Richman (Runner up)
Best Sports Writer: Tom Sheldrick (Nominee)

2007
Best Newspaper (Winner)
Best Reporter: Lucy Taylor (Winner)
Best Reporter: Adam Thorn (Nominee)
Best Sports Writer: Darius Austin (Nominee)
Best Critic: Richard Webb (Winner)

2006
Best Columnist: Ruth Mclean (Nominee)

2005
Best Newspaper (Nominee)
Best Small Budget Publication (Nominee)
Best Sports Writer: Simon Osborn (Winner)
Best Columnist: Jonathan Bray (Winner)

2004
Best Newspaper (Winner)
Best Small Budget Publication (Runner up)
Best Journalist: Jon Bentham (Winner)
Best Reporter: Jon Bentham (Nominee)
Best Feature Writer: Jon Bentham (Runner up)

2003
Best Newspaper (Winner)
Best Small Budget Publication (Nominee)
Best Journalist: Rob Harris (Winner)
Best Reporter: Rob Harris (Winner)
Best Travel Writer: Jon Bentham (Winner)
 Best Travel Writer: Rob Harris (Nominee)

2002
Best Newspaper (Winner)
Best Columnist: Gareth Walker (Winner)
Best Website (Winner)

2001
Best Website (Runner up)

Student Publication Association Awards 
2020

 Best Publication (Pending)
 Best Newspaper Design (Pending)
 Billy Dowling-Reid Award for Outstanding Commitment – Harry Clay and Chay Quinn (Pending)
 Best Science/Tech Piece – Maddie Jenkins (Pending)

2017

 Outstanding Commitment – Abbie Llewelyn (Winner)
 Best News Story – Josh Salisbury (Shortlisted)
 Best News Story – Huw James (Shortlisted)
 Best News Story – Abbie Llewelyn (Shortlisted)

2016

 Best Comment – Costas Mourselas (Highly Commended)
 Best Publication (Shortlisted)
 Best Sports Coverage (Shortlisted)
 Best Reporter – Thomas Butler-Roberts (Shortlisted)
 Best News Story – Jonny Long & Abbie Llewelyn (Shortlisted)
 Best Feature – Jonny Long (Shortlisted)

National Union of Students Awards
2014 Best Journalist: Jack Gevertz (Winner) 
2012 Best Media (Runner up)
2012 Best Journalist: Oliver Todd (Highly Commended)
2008 Best Journalist: Lucy Taylor (Nominee)

National Union of Students Journalism Awards
2006 Best Small Budget Publication (Winner)
2004 Best Publication Design (Winner) 
2004 Best Feature Writer: Jon Bentham (Winner)
2004 Best Arts Journalist: Sam Walton (Runner up)
2003 Best Newspaper (Winner)
2003 Best Reporter: Rob Harris (Winner)
2003 Best Arts Journalist: Bella Todd (Winner)
2001 Best Small Budget Publication (Winner)

References

External links
yorkVision

University of York
Student newspapers published in the United Kingdom
Newspapers established in 1987
Mass media in York
Newspapers published in Yorkshire
1987 establishments in England